Vincent Winter (29 December 1947 – 2 November 1998) was a Scottish child film actor who, as an adult, continued to work in the film industry as a production manager and in other capacities.

Career
Winter was born in Aberdeen, Scotland, and made his first film appearance at the age of six in The Kidnappers (US: The Little Kidnappers, 1953) jointly winning an Academy Juvenile Award, along with Jon Whiteley. He appeared in several films as a child including Beyond This Place (US: Web of Evidence, 1959), Gorgo (1961),  the Walt Disney features Greyfriars Bobby (1961), Almost Angels (1962), The Horse Without a Head (1963) and The Three Lives of Thomasina (1963).

As an adult, he continued to work in the film industry behind the scenes. He was a production manager on such films as For Your Eyes Only (1981), Superman III (1983), Indiana Jones and the Temple of Doom (1984) and The Color Purple (1985), and worked as part of a film crew in other tasks.

He died in Chertsey, Surrey, as a result of a heart attack.

Filmography

Actor

Production Manager

Second Unit Director or Assistant Director

Miscellaneous crew

References

External links
 
 

1947 births
1998 deaths
20th-century Scottish male actors
Male actors from Aberdeen
Scottish male child actors
Scottish male film actors
Scottish male television actors
Academy Juvenile Award winners
People from Aberdeen